A Very Brady Sequel is a 1996 American comedy film directed by Arlene Sanford (in her feature film directorial debut), with a screenplay by Harry Elfont, Deborah Kaplan, James Berg and Stan Zimmerman, and starring Shelley Long, Gary Cole and Tim Matheson. It also features cameos from RuPaul, Zsa Zsa Gabor, Rosie O'Donnell, Barbara Eden, David Spade, and Richard Belzer. Sequel to The Brady Bunch Movie (1995), it followed its predecessor by placing the 1970s Brady Bunch family in a contemporary 1990s setting, where much of the humor is derived from the resulting culture clash and the utter lack of awareness they show toward their relatively unusual lifestyle.

A Very Brady Sequel was released on August 23, 1996. The film received mixed reviews and earned less than half of what The Brady Bunch Movie did at the box office. A second sequel, the made-for-television feature The Brady Bunch in the White House, aired in November 2002.

Plot 
One seemingly typical evening, at the Brady house, a man claiming to be Carol's long-lost first husband, Roy Martin, shows up at the suburban Brady residence. The Bradys believe his story about suffering from amnesia and having plastic surgery after being injured. Mike has been planning a second wedding/renewal of vows for himself and Carol, for an anniversary present without her knowing, although Roy's arrival throws a monkey wrench into things. Throughout Roy's stay, he is openly hostile to them, his sarcasm and insults completely going over their heads.

Peter, who is trying to decide what career path to choose, starts idolizing and emulating Roy, which frequently gets him in trouble at the architect firm where Mike works. Peter later mentions Roy talking about "the big house", and Mike learns it means prison, making him suspicious.

Greg and Marcia both want to move out of their shared rooms and when neither wants to back down, they have to share the attic together. When Roy's arrival suggests that Carol and Mike might not be married, Greg and Marcia believe that they are technically not related. This leads them to realize they are in love with each other, but try to hide it from one another throughout their time together.

Bobby and Cindy start a "Detective Agency" hunting down her missing doll and upon finding it, they stumble upon a photo revealing Roy's true intentions. He is actually a con man named Trevor Thomas and is there to steal a familiar horse statue that is actually a $20 million ancient artifact.

The kids reveal to Carol his plans, and confront Trevor, who, in turn, kidnaps Carol and takes her hostage to Hawaii, where he plans to sell the artifact to Dr. Whitehead, a buyer in Hawaii. He also ties up the kids and Alice to keep them from intervening. Mike, who's now fully aware of Trevor's deception, having gone to the police with his suspicions, frees them, and the family flies to Hawaii to save Carol and foil Trevor's plans.

In Hawaii, Carol escapes from Trevor's clutches, and manages to find her way to Dr. Whitehead's estate before Trevor gets there. It turns out, Trevor was responsible for the boating accident that led to the disappearance of Dr. Whitehead's son Gilligan and Carol's first husband, a professor. In Dr. Whitehead's words, "The Minnow is lost", and he refuses to pay Trevor for the horse. Trevor attempts to hold Dr. Whitehead and Carol at gunpoint for payment, but Mike and the family arrive just in time to intervene, and, after a brief scuffle between the two men, in which Mike quickly gains the upper hand, Trevor is arrested and taken to jail.

Dr. Whitehead offers to pay the Bradys the $20 million for the horse, but Mike declines the offer, claiming it's a symbol of their togetherness. Cindy gives him her doll, to console him, as she's outgrown it, after almost losing her mother. Jan, who made up a pretend boyfriend named George Glass in order to make herself seem more popular, meets a real boy named George Glass during the family's trip to Hawaii, and they become a couple.

As Mike and Carol renew their vows in a ceremony held at their home, Marcia agrees to let Greg have the attic to himself, until he goes to college, and the two share one last on-screen kiss, before returning to being brother and sister. The movie ends with Carol tossing the bouquet, and a genie named Jeannie arriving just in time to catch it. She then claims to be Mike Brady's first wife, much to Mike and Carol's dismay.

Cast 
 Gary Cole as Mike Brady
 Shelley Long as Carol Brady
 Christopher Daniel Barnes as Greg Brady
 Christine Taylor as Marcia Brady
 Paul Sutera as Peter Brady
 Jennifer Elise Cox as Jan Brady
 Jesse Lee as Bobby Brady
 Olivia Hack as Cindy Brady
 Henriette Mantel as Alice Nelson
 Tim Matheson as Roy Martin/Trevor Thomas
 Brian Van Holt as Warren Mulaney
 John Hillerman as Dr. Whitehead

The film featured cameo appearances from RuPaul (reprising his role as Mrs. Cummings from the first film), Zsa Zsa Gabor (in her last screen role), Rosie O'Donnell, Barbara Eden (reprising her role as Jeannie from I Dream of Jeannie), David Spade, and Richard Belzer.

Release

Box office
A Very Brady Sequel was released in theaters on August 23, 1996. The film grossed $7.1 million on its opening weekend, debuting on 2,147 screens. While some critics preferred this sequel to its predecessor the film performed half as well at the box office, whereas its predecessor grossed $46 million domestically. Gross sales are estimated at $21.4 million.

Home media
A Very Brady Sequel was released by Paramount Home Video on VHS on February 11, 1997. It was released on DVD on June 10, 2003 and on April 25, 2017. The film has also been released digitally on Google Play.

Reception
The film received mixed reviews from film critics. On Rotten Tomatoes it has a score of 56% based on reviews from 36 critics. Roger Ebert judged that while it was not an outstanding film, it was noticeably better than its predecessor. He elaborated that it addressed his chief criticism of the original by showing more of the contemporary world the Bradys live in and finding humor in the contrast between their innocence and the dangers of the world around them. He gave it two and a half stars. Mick LaSalle of the San Francisco Chronicle instead found it not as fresh as the original, opining that while the subplots with the Brady children are bold and funny, the main plot failed to exploit its comedic possibilities. He still found it overall enjoyable enough to satisfy those who liked the first film, and commented that "as a satire of a sitcom that wasn't funny, it's often at its funniest when it's purposely stale".

References

External links 
 
 
 
 
 

1996 films
1996 comedy films
American comedy films
American parody films
American satirical films
American sequel films
American screwball comedy films
American slapstick comedy films
American films with live action and animation
Films about hostage takings
Films about identity theft
Films about kidnapping
Films about theft
Films based on television series
Films directed by Arlene Sanford
Films scored by Guy Moon
Films set in Hawaii
Films set in the 1990s
Films shot in Honolulu
Paramount Pictures films
The Brady Bunch films
The Ladd Company films
1996 directorial debut films
1990s English-language films
1990s American films